Valentina Cioltan (born 4 January 1952) is a Romanian athlete. She competed in the women's shot put at the 1972 Summer Olympics.

References

1952 births
Living people
Athletes (track and field) at the 1972 Summer Olympics
Romanian female shot putters
Olympic athletes of Romania
Place of birth missing (living people)